Ignacio Antonio (born 4 January 1995) is an Argentine professional footballer who plays as a midfielder for San Martín SJ.

Career
Antonio was a part of Juventud Unida de Villa Esther's academy early in his youth career, which preceded him joining Instituto in 2009. He first appeared in senior football in May 2015, when Instituto selected him on the substitutes bench for a Copa Argentina win over Patronato. It was a competition he later made his debut in, against Arsenal de Sarandí on 23 July 2014 as they won 1–3 in La Punta. In the succeeding August, Antonio's bow in a professional league arrived versus Colón in Primera B Nacional. A total of eighty-four appearances occurred in his opening six seasons with Instituto.

Career statistics
.

References

External links

1995 births
Living people
Footballers from Rosario, Santa Fe
Argentine footballers
Association football midfielders
Primera Nacional players
Instituto footballers
Deportivo Maipú players
San Martín de San Juan footballers